Tatjana Lofamakanda Pinto (born 2 July 1992) is a German athlete who competes as a sprinter.

Biography
Together with Leena Günther, Anne Cibis and Verena Sailer, Pinto won the gold medal at the 2012 European Athletics Championships in Helsinki at the 4×100 metres relay. The same team came in fifth at the 2012 Summer Olympics in London.

Pinto's father is Portuguese, while her mother was from Angola.

External links 
 

1992 births
Living people
German female sprinters
German people of Angolan descent
Athletes (track and field) at the 2012 Summer Olympics
Olympic athletes of Germany
European Athletics Championships medalists
Athletes (track and field) at the 2016 Summer Olympics
Sportspeople from Münster
Athletes (track and field) at the 2020 Summer Olympics
Olympic female sprinters

German people of Portuguese descent